Bobby Dan Dillon (February 23, 1930 – August 22, 2019) was an American professional football player in the National Football League (NFL). He played as a safety and spent his entire eight-year career with the Green Bay Packers.

Dillon was an All-American with the University of Texas Longhorns. Although he was a safety, he also returned kicks and played several games at halfback. He finished his college career with 13 interceptions on defense, one touchdown as a halfback, and multiple kick returns for touchdowns. He was drafted by the Green Bay Packers in the 3rd round (28th pick) of the 1952 NFL draft.

After multiple accidents during his childhood, Dillon lost one of his eyes and played his entire career with a glass eye. Despite his handicap, he became one of the most successful defensive backs of his era. His 52 career interceptions are  a Packers' franchise record. He was a four-time Associated Press All-Pro and four-time Pro Bowler. He intended to retire at the end of the 1958 season, but the Packers' new head coach, Vince Lombardi, convinced him to return for the 1959 season. After an injury halfway through the season, he lost his starting job and retired. The 1959 season was the only year during Dillon's tenure that the Packers had a winning record. In recognition of his football achievements, Dillon was elected to the Green Bay Packers Hall of Fame in 1974 and the Texas Sports Hall of Fame in 1996.

After his football career, Dillon earned a bachelor's degree and worked for Wilsonart for 36 years, eventually becoming president and chief executive. He died on August 22, 2019, at the age of 89, after complications from dementia. Five months after his death, he was elected to the Pro Football Hall of Fame as part of the NFL's centennial class, with the formal induction ceremony planned for August 2020.

Early life
Bobby Dan Dillon was born on February 23, 1930, in Pendleton, Texas, one of four children of Cyde and Ruby Dillon. His family moved to Temple, Texas where he grew up and his father was employed as a police officer.

As a child, a series of eye injuries led to the removal of Dillon's left eye. At the age of five or six, Dillon got a small piece of metal in his left eye, which caused a cataract to grow; Dillon had surgery to remove the cataract. Then, when Dillon was nine years old, he was hit in the face with a board, causing damage to the white of his eye which ultimately led to the deterioration of his left eye and prevented his eye from dilating. At the age of ten, Dillon had his left eye removed, and it was replaced with a glass eye. Dillon said of his missing eye: "I don't remember seeing out of that eye, so maybe that has something to do with it. If it gives me any trouble, I'm not aware of it, because I've never known anything else." According to one story, during a game in his professional career, Dillon's glass eye fell out onto the field. As he picked it up, a referee joked to Dillon, "What would you do if you lost your other eye?" Dillon responded, "I'd be a referee."

He attended Temple High School, where he played football from 1945 to 1947. In his senior season, Dillon led Temple to a 6-2-1 record, losing in the 10AA district title game to the eventual state champions, Waco High School. Dillon earned a football scholarship from the University of Texas at Austin. In an interview, Dillon revealed that contingent upon receiving the scholarship from Texas, the university had required that Dillon's father sign a waiver, indicating that if Dillon suffered another eye injury while playing football, the family would not hold Texas responsible; Dillon's father signed the waiver.

College career 
At Texas, Dillon was an All-American safety, finishing his college career with 13 interceptions. Dillon was a co-captain on the 1951 Southwest Conference (SWC)-champion Longhorns team which reached a ranking of no. 3 in the country before losing the 1951 Cotton Bowl to the Tennessee Volunteers. Dillon's 190 interception return yards was a Texas school record until 1995.

In addition to playing safety in college, Dillon also played several games at halfback and returned kicks. In Dillon's college debut, against Texas Tech, he returned a punt 55 yards for a touchdown and also scored a 20-yard rushing touchdown in the same game. In his career at Texas, Dillon had 47 returns for 830 yards. In the 1950 season alone, Dillon had 15 punt returns for 334 yards, including a game-winning 84-yard punt return for a touchdown against Baylor University.

At Texas, Dillon also participated in track and field as a sprinter. Dillon was a member of two SWC-champion track and field teams while at Texas.

Professional career 
Dillon was drafted out of Texas by the Green Bay Packers in the third round (28th pick) of the 1952 NFL Draft. Dillon played with the Packers from 1952 to 1959, becoming the all-time Packers career interceptions leader, with 52. Dillon led the Packers in interceptions for seven of his eight seasons in the league, and he had nine interceptions in a season three times. Between 1953 and 1958 he had 48 interceptions, for an average of eight interceptions per season. When he retired, Dillon had the second most interceptions in league history, behind only Emlen Tunnell, who was at that time Dillon's teammate.

For his "ballhawking" skills, Dillon was nicknamed "The Hawk" by his Packer teammates. In his career, Dillon recorded 976 interception return yards, including five he returned for touchdowns. Dillon's 976 interception return yards is the most in Packers' history, and in 1956 he had a league-best 244 interception return yards. Dillon also shares the team record for interceptions in a game, with 4, which he recorded in a loss against the eventual NFL-champion Detroit Lions in the 1953 Thanksgiving game. With less than two minutes left in his record-setting game, Dillon injured his knee, which caused him to miss the final two games of the 1953 season. Despite missing those two games, Dillon finished 1953 with nine interceptions and was healthy enough to return at the start of 1954.

Dillon was selected to the Pro Bowl every season from 1955 to 1958, and was named an Associated Press All-Pro in 1954, 1955, 1957, and 1958, while also earning All-Pro honors from other organizations in 1953 and 1956.

Over Dillon's professional career, he played under four full-time coaches: Gene Ronzani (1952–53), Lisle Blackbourn (1954–57), Scooter McLean (1958), and Vince Lombardi (1959). During the 1957 season, while still a player Dillon helped coach defensive backs under Blackbourn after defensive coach Tom Hearden had a stroke.

In June 1959, Dillon informed the team that he intended to retire. However, the Packers' new coach, Vince Lombardi employed the team's personnel director Jack Vainisi to convince Dillon to return to the Packers, and Vainisi was successful. Dillon returned for the 1959 NFL season, playing in the first eight games before being sidelined with a leg injury and losing his starting job to John Symank. Dillon ultimately retired before the end of that season, at the age of 29. Upon Dillon's retirement, Lombardi called Dillon the "best in the league" and referred to him as irreplaceable.

Later life
After retiring from the NFL, Dillon earned a bachelor's degree in accounting and went on to work for Wilsonart, a manufacturer of high-pressure decorative laminates. Dillon remained with the company for 36 years, eventually becoming president and chief executive. Dillon retired from Wilsonart in 1995.

On January 27, 1951, Dillon married Ann Dillon, with whom he had two children. Ann Dillon died in 2017.

Dillon died on August 22, 2019, at the age of 89 in Temple, due to complications from dementia. Dillon was survived by his two children, three grandchildren, and five great-grandchildren.

Legacy
Although Dillon consistently played at a high level throughout his career, his tenure coincided with one of the least successful time periods in Packers' history. During his eight-year career, the Packers only had one winning season and went a combined 33–55–2. This included the 1958 season, when the Packers had the worst record in team history (1–10–1). Dillon's only winning season came after Lombardi convinced him to un-retire for the 1959 season, where he teamed up with Emlen Tunnell to form one of the best defensive backfields in history.

Dillon was well respected though for the personal success he attained in the NFL, especially considering he played his entire career with just one eye. However, due to the poor play of the Packers during his tenure, Dillon had to wait many years of his accolades. In 1969, he was named to the Packers 50th Anniversary team. Five years later he was elected to the Green Bay Packers Hall of Fame. However, he was consistently overlooked for the penultimate honor of induction into the Pro Football Hall of Fame. In 2011, the Professional Football Researchers Association (PFRA) named Dillon to the "Hall of Very Good Class of 2011", an informal honor given by the PFRA to the best NFL players not yet in the Hall of Fame.

However, after over 50 years of eligibility, it was announced in January 2020 that Dillon would be enshrined in the Pro Football Hall of Fame as a member of the NFL's centennial class, a special expanded class of inductees to celebrate the 100th season of the NFL.  His bust was sculpted by Scott Myers.  With his induction, Dillon became the 26th Packer player in the Hall of Fame. The announcement of Dillon's Hall of Fame selection came less than a year after his death.

Raymond Berry, a Hall of Fame receiver who played for the Baltimore Colts from 1955 to 1967, praised Dillon in 2013, calling him "one of the most superior athletes you’ll ever find in the NFL". In 2004, teammate Dave Hanner summed up Dillon's reputation:

Notes

References

External links

 

1930 births
2019 deaths
People from Temple, Texas
Players of American football from Texas
American football safeties
Texas Longhorns football players
Green Bay Packers players
Western Conference Pro Bowl players
Pro Football Hall of Fame inductees